Evan MacCormick (15 March 1882 – 13 November 1918) was a New Zealand cricketer. He played thirteen first-class matches for Auckland between 1900 and 1914.

MacCormick was educated at Auckland Grammar School and became a barrister and solicitor, a partner in an Auckland law firm. His highest first-class score was 77, the highest score in the match, when Auckland lost narrowly to the touring MCC in 1906-07. He was the outstanding batsman of the Auckland Cricket Association competition in 1914–15, scoring 809 runs at an average of 101.12, with four centuries. 

MacCormick died in November 1918 after contracting influenza and then pneumonia.

See also
 List of Auckland representative cricketers

References

External links
 

1882 births
1918 deaths
People educated at Auckland Grammar School
New Zealand cricketers
Auckland cricketers
Cricketers from Auckland
Deaths from Spanish flu